La Pedrera is a village and resort on the Atlantic Coast in the Rocha Department of Uruguay. Although it has a very small permanent population, in summer it is an important coastal resort. La Pedrera is also famous for its proximity to the Valle de la Luna, which extend to Santa Isabel de la Pedrera.

Population
In 2011 La Pedrera had a population of 225 permanent inhabitants and 753 dwellings.

Source: Instituto Nacional de Estadística de Uruguay

Places of worship 
 Our Lady of Lourdes Chapel (Roman Catholic)

References

External links
INE map of La Pedrera, Pta. Rubia, Tajamares and San Antonio
Tourist information for La Pedrera
Photos of La Pedrera
Photos Valle de la Luna Santa Isabel de la Pedrera

Populated places in the Rocha Department
Seaside resorts in Uruguay